Sushma Godawari College is one of the oldest and largest college in Itahari, Nepal. Established in 1992 A.D. (2049 B.S.), Godawari College is affiliated with Tribhuwan University, offering 3-year BBS in both English and Nepali, and 4-year BSC-CSIT degrees.

It has also established the CTEVT-recognized Sushma Koirala Memorial Engineering College (SKMEC) in 2057 B.S. (c. 2000 A.D.), offering a 3-year Diploma in Civil and Computer Engineering. It also provides short-term training in plumbing, house wiring, along with electrical and electronics training.

The college has boarding facilities, libraries in both school and college, a canteen, Computers and Science labs and first aid facilities.

See also
Godawari Vidhya Mandir

References

External links
 SushmaGodawari.com

Universities and colleges in Nepal
1992 establishments in Nepal